Pątnów  is a village in Wieluń County, Łódź Voivodeship, in central Poland. It is the seat of the gmina (administrative district) called Gmina Pątnów.

The village has an approximate population of 1,400.

History

Its name appears in the written records also as Patnowo, Pantchanow. In 1339 the village leader Stanimir sold the slaughter in Wieluń for the mill and a quarter of field in Pątnów. In 16th the local parish included Pątnów and Bieniec. In those times the village belonged partly to Wieluń and partly to Mateusz Skrzyński. In 1553 it is mentioned that the wooden church was there at the beginning of the 16th century. At the beginning of the 19th century a small landed estate of about 80 ha changed the owners for Germans- the Kreczmers. At the beginning of 20th century there were distillery, the manufacture of starch, ponds and a park (1.08 ha) planned by the Kreczmers. Before World War I the landed estate was bought by Kobylański, the former leaseholder of an estate in Bieniec. On the village grounds there were “Osada Młyńska” (“The Mill Settlement”), although there wasn't any mill and so called “Jatka”- with reference to Janina Szymańska's estate, which had existed here in the past. In 1926 the railway stop was built. In September 1940 Germans displaced Polish people from the Pątnów Commune and settled Germans from Wołyń here. Every German Family got three Polish farms. The name was changed for Patenau (Bieniec for Biennenzel, Dzietrzniki for Dietzfield, Kadłub for Rumfeck). After the war the former manor farms' terrain was taken over by Gminna Spółdzielnia (The Commune Association), which has devastated previous manor order.

Transport

The village is cut through by a busy trunk road 43 Częstochowa- Wieluń and by a railway line 181 Herby Nowe- Wieluń Dąbrowa. There is a station for passenger trains.

Church and Chapel

The present Church was built in 1917–1927 on the place of the former wooden church. On the rood beam there is a baroque crucifix from 18th century. There is also a font from 18th century. On the village's terrain there is a beautiful stone chapel from 18th century. It is covered by a four-sided tent roof. Inside there is a historic sculpture of Pensive Christ.

References

Villages in Wieluń County